The 2016–17 season was the 137th season of competitive football by Rangers.

Overview
Rangers played a total of 49 competitive matches during the 2016–17 season.

The club's pre-season plans were confirmed in May with the first-team's squad travelling to the United States for a training camp which incorporated a friendly match against United Soccer League side Charleston Battery. The fallout from the 2016 Scottish Cup Final fan violence continued with the SFA announcing a former Sheriff principal would chair the independent commission into the disorder. The commission reported on 5 August and concluded the pitch invasion was sparked by the high excitement of Hibernian fans, yet neither club could be blamed. The report highlighted security plans were appropriate and that the Scottish Government should consider criminalising pitch invasions. However, Rangers raised concerns about several factual inaccuracies and contradictions in the report and asked to discuss this with the SFA. On 30 August, Rangers and Hibernian were issued with notices of complaint by the Scottish FA's compliance officer in relation to the Scottish Cup final. The end of May, post the 2016 Scottish Cup Final, saw Rangers continue preparations for the forthcoming season with the signing of English Championship winner Joey Barton from Burnley, Liverpool youth player Jordan Rossiter, former Tottenham Hotspur play-maker Niko Kranjčar and Rangers managing director Stewart Robertson also disclosed Warburton and Weir were negotiating new contracts, with the pair agreeing one-year extensions on 12 July. Warburton would go on to bring in eleven new players in total, including paying a million-pound-plus transfer fee for Englishman Joe Garner which represented the largest investment made by Rangers in a player for over five years since the signing of current club captain Lee Wallace in July 2011.

The side began the season in mid-July as part of the new look League Cup format, paired in a group with Motherwell, Annan Athletic, East Stirlingshire and Stranraer. The season got off to a winning start as the side beat Motherwell and Annan Athletic by 2-0 respectively. After topping their group and strong showings in the two subsequent rounds, Rangers set up a semi-final against Celtic, however, the side lost 1-0 which ended their participation in the competition. The side league form proved equally fruitless as the side engaged in a faulting start to the season which culminated in a humiliating 5-1 defeat to Old Firm rivals, Celtic. The opening league match of the season saw Rangers stutter to a 1-1 draw at home to Hamilton Academical and despite registering wins in the following to matches Rangers would go through the month of September without winning a league match, including defeats to both Aberdeen and Celtic. The aftermath from the latter match saw Rangers suspend midfielder Joey Barton for three weeks. Barton had been involved in a training ground bust up with fellow midfielder Andy Halliday a few days after losing to Celtic. The suspension was extended by another week on 9 October and Barton was also charged by the Scottish Football Association for  breaking rules relating to gambling on football matches. Upon the completion of his suspension, Barton returned to Ibrox for a meeting on 27 October, however, upon its conclusion it emerged that he remained suspended by the club and no party made further comment. In the meanwhile, despite the first-team's indifferent league form the side still sat second in the Scottish Premiership by the end of October, even though two of the marquee summer signings had effectively been ruled out for the season, with Barton returning from suspension but being relegated to the youth-team and Niko Kranjčar suffering cruciate ligament which sidelined him for the rest of the season. Barton was unhappy at being relegated to the youth team and was signed off with stress on 8 November but the saga came to a conclusion two days later when the Englishman agreed to a mutual contract terminated.

The sides form improved through December, with the team building a four match winning run on the back of a poor 2-0 defeat to Heart of Midlothian at Tynecastle on 30 November. However, the final two matches of 2016 saw the side collect only one point from a possible six with a draw away to St Johnstone and defeat in the third Old Firm derby of the season. This left the club second in the table going into 2017 and the mid-season break, two points ahead of third placed Aberdeen although the latter did have a game in hand. The January transfer window saw the club released several former youth prospects who had failed to meet expectations, while Warburton brought in two young loanee signings from English Premier League sides in the shape of Emerson Hyndman and Jon Toral from Bournemouth and Arsenal respectively. However, the lack of any permanent outfield signings drew criticism, as did the performances of the previous summers transfers, with particular focus being placed on the role of Head of Recruitment Frank McParland. On 10 February 2017, manager Warburton, assistant manager David Weir and McParland left Rangers, with the former being replaced by Graeme Murty who was placed in caretaker control of the first-team. Several reasons for the trio departure were highlighted by the media, as well as the club. The first-team's poor performance in the first half of the season a prominent cause, which crystallised after an embarrassing 4-1 defeat away to Heart of Midlothian on 1 February and an insipid 1-1 draw at home to Ross County three days later, a match which proved to be Warburtons last game in charge of Rangers. The poor signing policy was mooted, however, the club also stated that the management team were not committed to the job and reported the team had tendered their resignations five days before being replaced which Warburton later disputed. Early contenders for the role included former Rangers manager Alex McLeish and former Rangers defender Frank de Boer. On Valentine's Day 2017, Managing director Stewart Robertson announced that the club would seek to appoint a Director of Football to work alongside a new first-team manager. Meanwhile, Murty's time in charge, began with a fourth round Scottish cup win over Greenock Morton, however, league formed remained indifferent his first two league matches ende in away defeats to Dundee and Inverness CT. This left the side in third place, six points adrift of Aberdeen, at the beginning of March. A dramatic 3-2 win of St Johnstone saw Murty register his only league win in his six-game spell as manager with his last two games in charge seeing him set up to a Scottish Cup semi-final against Celtic after a 6-0 win over Hamilton Academical, the team's largest win of the season, before drawing the third league Old Firm match. On 11 March, Rangers confirmed Caixinha as the club's sixteenth manager with the Portuguese coach appointed two days later. However, the pursuit of a Director of Football was not as successful as the Board's first choice, Southampton's Ross Wilson, turning down the offer of the role.

Away from football, the board instigated court proceedings against four of its former executives and investor Mike Ashley. The case against former chief executives Charles Green and Derek Llambias, former commercial director Imran Ahmad, former financial director Brian Stockbridge and Ashley was brought regarding a loss of income caused by retail deals agreed between the company that owns the club and Sports Direct from 2012 to 2015. Details of Rangers legal claim was revealed on 12 August after Ashley's lawyers succeeded in a bid to the documents disclosed. According to the papers lodged with the Court of Session, Rangers sought approximately £4.1m in damages caused by alleged negligence by Green and other club staff from which Ashley unfairly benefited. Rangers regained representation at a domestic football level as managing director Stewart Robertson was appointed to the SFA professional game board, although Robertson had initially signalled his intent to stand for the SPFL board but withdrew due to a lack of support. Meanwhile, the former Rangers owner Craig Whyte was the only person facing fraud charges relating to the liquidation of The Rangers Football Club Plc, proceedings began in June. In a bizarre twist, former Rangers vice-chairman Donald Findlay QC was appointed to Whyte's legal team and will defend Whyte when he faces charges relating to the acquisition of the club in May 2011 and its subsequent financial mismanagement. On 22 December, at his pre-trial Whyte entered a not guilty plea at the High Court in Glasgow. The trial concerning accusations of fraudulent acquisition of the Club began in April 2017, with former Rangers managers Walter Smith and Ally McCoist called to give evidence about the financial situation at the Oldco preceding Whyte's reign.

The corporate aftermath of Whyte's reign was continued and it was revealed that Oldco administrators have raised legal action against Police Scotland and the Lord Advocate while oldco creditors would receive £2 million less in potential payouts after the liquidation costs increased, leaving the total payout at £16.663 million. Although RIFC did settle a fine imposed upon the Oldco by the Nimmo Smith commission after a tribunal held against the club in October 2015, the total cost was £286,000. At the start of February, it was reported that liquidators of the Oldco, BDO, had launched a legal action against former administrators Duff & Phelps over the business strategies adopted by the administrating team and seeking up to £28.9m in damages.

The spectre of Mike Ashley continued to haunt Rangers in the early part of the season. Ashley lost a legal challenge to the SFA's fine over breaching dual ownership rules with reports he faced a £250,000 legal bill. In October, he was ordered to pay half of the SFA's legal costs and an additional fee for the costs incurred from receiving specialist legal advice. Moreover, further failed legal action meant Ashley was required to pay the legal costs of the SFA and Dave King following a failed bid to overturn the decision that King was a "fit and proper" person from April 2016. Despite standing down from the board of Rangers Retail in June 2016, the club's joint merchandising venture with Sports Direct, Ashley refused to relinquish his grip over Rangers retail operations. After reaching an impasse in its attempts to renegotiation the retail agreements with Sports Direct, an stand off ensued between the retailer and Rangers with the latter withdrew removing rights to use the club's  intellectual property which would impact on the sale of Rangers new Puma football kits. Despite the club withdrawing permission to use its trademarks, which effectively halted the slae of kits, Puma released the 2016-17 kits at the beginning of August. This led to the board to consider replacing the Puma kits with an alternative. The contract with Rangers Retail reportedly earned the club only four pence from every pound spent on merchandise and was highlighted as a reason for Rangers weak financial performance. On Halloween 2016 it emerged that Ashley lodged a counter-suit against Rangers, King and director Paul Murray, with initial proceedings regarding the case being heard at the High Court of Justice in March 2017.

The board released RIFC's  annual accounts on 28 October which revealed annual losses had been halved to £3.3m and turnover increased to £22.2m, however, further funding was required to maintain the business as a going concern. In March 2017, a decision Takeover Appeal Board (TAB) following a complaint by former Rangers chairman David Somers ruled that Dave King had been acting in concerted with other investors during King's March 2015 boardroom takeover. This meant that King was liable to purchase all of the shares in RIFC, with the TAB setting a price of 20p per share. A few days later, RIFC revealed an operating profit of £300,000 in unaudited results for the six months to 31 December 2016, although this equated to a pre-tax loss of £278,000.

In June 2016, it was announced by the SPFL that the Challenge Cup would be expanded to include teams from the Welsh Premier League, Northern Irish Premiership and an under-20s side from each Scottish Premiership club. On the same day as this announcement, the under-20s team coach Ian Durrant was relieved of his duties in a coaching reshuffle, with Rangers appointing Graeme Murty as Head Development Squad Coach on 17 August, to replace him. The draw for the first round of the 2016–17 Challenge Cup was made with Rangers under-20s side paired with Stirling University F.C. who play in the Lowland Football League. The U20 side progressed conformably beating Stirling University 4-0 at Forthbank Stadium with Josh Jeffries scoring a brace. A second round tie with Scottish League One side Stenhousemuir was set-up, again played at Forthbank, however, the side could not match its previous performance and went down 3-1 with Ryan Hardie netting the Rangers goal.

Rangers fan groups Rangers Supporters' Trust, Rangers Supporters Assembly and Rangers First merged to form Club 1872 in late May, and two-weeks later it announced that the new organisation had purchased enough shares to make it the sixth largest shareholder in RIFC. Harmony did not last for long amongst the support, however, as three directors of the Rangers First resigned from the organisation over a row regarding its governance, with Rangers First now the shareholding vehicle for Club 1872. On 30 September, the results of the first elections to Club 1872's board was announced with seven members elected including Rangers current company secretary James Blair, former requisitioner Alex Wilson, as well as the leader of Sons of Struth, Craig Houston. In November, the fans group increased its holding further to become the fifth largest individual shareholder, possessing just over five million ordinary shares, however, further setbacks saw three directors resign from the board of Club 1872 after only six months in post.

Results & fixtures

Pre-season and friendlies

Scottish Premiership

Scottish League Cup

Scottish Cup

Statistics

Squad information

Squad statistics

Goal scorers

Last updated: 21 May 2017
Source: Match reports
Only competitive matches

Disciplinary record

Last updated: 21 May 2017
Source: Match reports
Only competitive matches

Team Statistics

Overall

Scottish Premiership

Standings

Results summary

Results by round

League Cup

Group F

Club

Board of directors
Rangers International Football Club Plc

 

  

The Rangers Football Club Ltd

Coaching staff

Other staff

Transfers

In

First-team

Total expenditure: £2.67m

Academy

Total income: £0m

Out

First-team

Total income: £0m

Academy

Total income: £0m

New contracts

First-team

Last updated: 28 April 2017

Academy

Last updated: 9 May 2017

References 

2016-17
Scottish football clubs 2016–17 season